Halkirk was a railway station located on the southern edge of the village of Halkirk, in Caithness in the Highland council area.

The station opened on 28 July 1874. It was one of a number of smaller stations on the Far North Line which were closed in 1960.

References

Further reading

External links 
 Sutherland and Caithness Railway RAILSCOT
 Halkirk RAILSCOT

Disused railway stations in Caithness
Former Highland Railway stations
Railway stations in Great Britain opened in 1874
Railway stations in Great Britain closed in 1960